Man on a Swing is a 1974 American thriller film directed by Frank Perry and written by David Zelag Goodman. The film stars Cliff Robertson, Joel Grey, Dorothy Tristan, Elizabeth Wilson and George Voskovec and was released on February 27, 1974 by Paramount Pictures.
The film is loosely drawn from a true-life murder investigation and based on the non-fiction book The Girl on the Volkswagen Floor (1971) by journalist William Arthur Clark.

Plot
Police detective Lee Tucker is investigating the murder of a woman. He has little evidence until factory worker Franklin Wills approaches him, identifying himself as a clairvoyant. Wills goes into trances during which he says that he can see the murder taking place. Tucker wonders whether Wills is truly clairvoyant or has an ulterior motive.

Cast

See also
 List of American films of 1974

References

External links 
 

1970s thriller films
1974 films
American thriller films
Paramount Pictures films
Films directed by Frank Perry
American police detective films
1970s English-language films
1970s American films